The Ohio Community College Athletic Conference or OCCAC is a college athletic conference whose member institutions are community colleges in the states of Ohio and Indiana. It is a member of Region 12 of the National Junior College Athletic Association (NJCAA).

History
The OCCAC has been around since 1993 in its current state. Prior to 1993, the OCCAC was known as the Ohio Junior College Athletic Conference (OJCAC) and the Turnpike Conference.  Currently, the OCCAC has full or limited sport members from 12 community colleges.

Sports sponsored
Current sports with full conference membership (at least four schools participating) include, women's volleyball, men's basketball, women's basketball, softball and baseball. Several schools also compete in non-conference sports such as men's soccer, women's soccer, track and field, men's golf, women's golf and cross country. The conference's sponsorship of men's golf ended after 2016.

Member schools

Current members 
The OCCAC currently has 12 full members, all but one are public schools:

Notes

Affiliate members
The OCCAC currently has two affiliate members, both are public schools:

Notes

Former members
The OCCAC had one former full member, which was also a private school:

Notes

Sponsored sports by school

See also
 Michigan Community College Athletic Association, also in NJCAA Region 12

References

External links
 Official Site of the Ohio Community College Athletic Conference
 NJCAA Website
 NJCAA Region 12 website

NJCAA conferences
Conferences